Jake Bibby (born 17 June 1996) is an English professional rugby league footballer who plays as a er or  for the Huddersfield Giants in the Betfred Super League.

He previously played for the Salford Red Devils and the Wigan Warriors in the Super League. Bibby spent time on loan from Salford for Oldham and Halifax in the Championship, and the North Wales Crusaders in League 1.

Background
Bibby was born in Wigan, Greater Manchester, England.

Playing career

Salford
Bibby made his Salford début in a Super League Super 8s match away at Hull Kingston Rovers on 27 September 2015.

He played in the 2019 Super League Grand Final defeat by St Helens at Old Trafford.

Halifax
He has made 3 appearances on Dual Registration for Halifax RLFC in 2017.

Wigan Warriors
Bibby moved to Wigan ahead of the 2020 Super League season. He played in the club's 8-4 2020 Super League Grand Final loss against St Helens at the Kingston Communications Stadium in Hull.  Bibby scored a try for Wigan in the second half of the game.

In round 1 of the 2021 Super League season, he scored two tries for Wigan in a 20-18 victory over Leigh.  The following week, he scored a hat-trick in Wigan's 34-6 victory over Wakefield.
In round 6 of the 2021 Super League season, he scored two tries for Wigan in a 30-16 victory over Leigh.
In round 1 of the 2022 Super League season, Bibby scored two tries in a 24-10 victory over Hull Kingston Rovers.
On 28 May 2022, Bibby played for Wigan in their 2022 Challenge Cup Final victory over Huddersfield.

Huddersfield Giants
On 28 September 2022, Bibby signed a three-year deal with the Huddersfield Giants.

References

External links

Salford Red Devils profile
SL profile

1996 births
Living people
English rugby league players
Halifax R.L.F.C. players
Huddersfield Giants players
North Wales Crusaders players
Oldham R.L.F.C. players
Rugby league players from Wigan
Rugby league wingers
Salford Red Devils players
Wigan Warriors players